Exilia is a genus of sea snails in the family Ptychatractidae.

Species
, species within the genus Exilia include:
 †Exilia alanbeui 
 Exilia blanda 
 Exilia claydoni 
 Exilia cognata 
 Exilia cortezi 
 Exilia crassicostata 
 †Exilia dalli 
 Exilia elegans 
 Exilia expeditionis 
 Exilia fedosovi 
 †Exilia frejaea 
 Exilia gracilior 
 Exilia graphiduloides 
 †Exilia hampdenensis 
 Exilia hilgendorfi 
 Exilia karukera 
 Exilia kiwi 
 Exilia krigei 
 †Exilia leachi 
 †Exilia nodulifera 
 †Exilia pergracilis 
 †Exilia pergracilis  (secondary homonym of E. pergracilis )
 Exilia prellei 
 †Exilia terebriformis 
 Exilia vagrans 
 †Exilia vixcostata 
 †Exilia waihaoensis 
 †Exilia wellmani 
 †Exilia zelandica

References

 Finlay, H. J. 1927. New specific names for Austral Mollusca. Transactions of the New Zealand Institute. 57: 488-533, page 506.
 Kantor, Yu. I.; Bouchet, P.; & A. Oleinik 2001. A revision of the recent species of Exilia, formerly Benthovoluta (Gastropoda: Turbinellidae). Ruthenica 11(2): 81-136.

Ptychatractidae